A tavern is a type of business where people gather to drink alcoholic beverages and be served food such as different types of roast meats and cheese, and (mostly historically) where travelers would receive lodging. An inn is a tavern that has a license to put up guests as lodgers. The word derives from the Latin taberna whose original meaning was a shed, workshop, stall, or pub.

Over time, the words "tavern" and "inn" became interchangeable and synonymous. In England, inns started to be referred to as public houses or pubs and the term became standard for all drinking houses.

Europe

France
From at least the 14th century, taverns, along with inns and later cabarets, were the main places to dine out. Typically, a tavern offered various roast meats, as well as simple foods like bread, cheese, herring and bacon. Some offered a wider variety of foods, though it would be cabarets and later traiteurs which offered the finest meals before the restaurant appeared in the 18th century. Their stated purpose, however, was to serve wine (not beer or cider, which had other outlets) and they were so disreputable that women of any standing avoided them.

After 1500, taxes on wine and other alcoholic beverages grew increasingly more burdensome, not only because of the continual increase in the level of taxation but also because of the bewildering variety and multiplicity of the taxes. This chaotic system was enforced by an army of tax collectors. The resultant opposition took many forms. Wine growers and tavern keepers concealed wine and falsified their methods of selling it to take advantage of lower tax rates. The retailers also refilled their casks secretly from hidden stocks. Wine merchants stealthily circumvented inspection stations to avoid local import duties. When apprehended, some defrauders reacted with passive resignation, while others resorted to violence. Situated at the heart of the country town or village, the tavern was one of the traditional centers of social and political life before 1789, a meeting place for both the local population and travelers passing through and a refuge for rogues and scoundrels. Taverns symbolized opposition to the regime and to religion.

Taverns sometimes served as restaurants. In 1765, in Paris was founded the first restaurant in the modern sense of the term. However, the first Parisian restaurant worthy of the name was the one founded by Beauvilliers in 1782 in the Rue de Richelieu, called the Grande Taverne de Londres.

Émile Zola's novel L'Assommoir ("The tavern") (1877) depicted the social conditions typical of alcoholism in Paris among the working classes. The drunk destroyed not only his own body, but also his employment, his family, and other interpersonal relationships. The characters Gervaise Macquart and her husband Coupeau exemplified with great realism the physical and moral degradation of alcoholics. Zola's correspondence with physicians reveals that he used authentic medical sources for his realistic depictions in the novel.

Germany 

A common German name for German taverns or pubs is Kneipe. Drinking practices in 16th-century Augsburg, Germany, suggest that the use of alcohol in early modern Germany followed carefully structured cultural norms. Drinking was not a sign of insecurity and disorder. It helped define and enhance men's social status and was therefore tolerated among men as long as they lived up to both the rules and norms of tavern society and the demands of their role as householders. Tavern doors were closed to respectable women unaccompanied by their husbands, and society condemned drunkenness among women, but when alcohol abuse interfered with the household, women could deploy public power to impose limits on men's drinking behaviour.

United Kingdom

Taverns were popular places used for business as well as for eating and drinking – the London Tavern was a notable meeting place in the 18th and 19th centuries, for example. However, the word tavern is no longer in popular use in the UK as there is no distinction between a tavern and an inn. Both establishments serve wine and beer/ale.  The term 'pub' (an abbreviation of 'public house') is now used to describe these houses.  The legacy of taverns and inns is now only found in the pub names, e.g. Fitzroy Tavern, Silver Cross Tavern, Spaniards Inn, etc. The word also survives in songs such as "There is a Tavern in the Town".

The range and quality of pubs varies wildly throughout the UK as does the range of beers, wines, spirits and foods available. Most quality pubs will still serve cask ales and food.  In recent years there has been a move towards "gastro" pubs where the menu is more ambitious. Originally, taverns served as rest stops about every fifteen miles and their main focus was to provide shelter to anyone who was traveling. Such taverns would be divided into two major parts – the sleeping quarters and the bar. There is generally a sign with some type of symbol, often related to the name of the premises, to draw in customers. The purpose of this is to indicate that the establishment sells alcohol and to set it apart from the competition.

Scandinavia 
Scandinavia had very high drinking rates, which led to the formation of a powerful prohibition movement in the 19th century. Magnusson (1986) explains why consumption of spirits was so high in a typical preindustrial village (Eskilstuna) in Sweden, 1820–50. An economic feature of this town of blacksmiths was the Verlag, or outwork production system, with its complex network of credit relationships. The tavern played a crucial role in cultural and business life and was also the place where work and leisure were fused. Heavy drinking facilitated the creation of community relationships in which artisans and workers sought security. Buying drinks rather than saving money was a rational strategy when, before adjustment to a cash economy, it was essential to raise one's esteem with fellow craftsmen to whom one could turn for favors in preference to the Verlag capitalist.

Greece 
A restaurant in Greece is commonly known as a taverna. Their history begins in Classical times, with the earliest evidence of a taverna discovered at the Ancient Agora of Athens; the style remains the same to this day. Greek tavernes (plural of taverna) are the most common restaurants in Greece. A typical menu includes portion dishes, or small dishes of meat and fish, as well as salads and appetizers. Mageirefta is the menu section that includes a variety of different casserole cooked dishes every day. The other choices are mainly prepared roasted (tis oras) or fried. Orektika (appetizers) include small dishes of Greek sauces, alifes, usually eaten on bites of bread. Tavernes offer different kinds of wines and retsina in barrels or in bottles, ouzo or tsipouro, with beer and refreshments being a recent addition. In Byzantine times, tavernes were the place for a social gathering, to enjoy a meal, live music and friendly talk with a drink accompanied by small variety dishes (mezes).

Former Yugoslavia 
In former Yugoslavia, the kafana serves food and alcoholic beverages.

Czech Republic & Slovakia 
The most frequent Czech translation of tavern or pub is "hospoda". It comes out from hospodář (landlord) and is also close to hostitel (host), host (guest) and hostina (dinner, banquet). And also to Russian gospodin (master, lord, sir) and, not to forget, to hospitality. Traditionally, "hospoda" or "hostinec" were full-fledged facilities, providing lodging, meals and drink, an inn. In modern times, the meaning of the word has a bit narrowed. Nevertheless, it is used colloquially to denote both traditional restaurants where people go to eat, and bars, where people mainly go to drink and socialize. "Hospoda" is nowadays a very widespread but only colloquiall word, while "hostinec" or "pohostinství" were often official names of such establishment in the 20th century, now a bit obsolete. "Hospoda" could be with meals served or without, typically with tapped beer. (This term is not used for wine bars.) As drinking beer is an important part of the Czech culture, inviting to "hospoda" generally means: "let's go and have a drink together, let's meet, chat, and socialize…". It is often equiped with a TV, billiards table, darts etc. Pubs serve both local regulars as well as excursionists, tourists and other guests. 

Establishments specialized primarily in the consumption of beer (beer bars) are called "výčep" ("výčap" in Slovak), expressively "nálevna", or "pajzl" (from German Baisel, originally from Jidish). "Knajpa" (from German) is an expressive word, and "krčma" is rather archaic in Czech. The word "taverna" (from Italian) is understood as a foreign term for establishment from South-European cultures, especially Greek or Italian.

In Moravia, especially South Moravia, this social role is rather fulfilled by "wine cellars". 

Slovak language prefers the word "krčma" as a neutral colloquial term for pubs and restaurants. It is an old panslavic word.

Asia

Iraq
One of the earliest references to a tavern is found in the Code of Hammurabi.

North America

See also

 Bar (establishment)
 Coaching inn
 Izakaya
 List of bars
 List of public house topics
 Prohibition
 Prohibition in the United States
 Pub (public house)
 Roadhouse (premises)
 Taverna
 Tavern clock
 Woman's Christian Temperance Union

References

Bibliography
 Blocker, Jack S. (ed.) Alcohol and Temperance in Modern History: An International Encyclopedia (2 vol 2003)
 Cherrington, Ernest, (ed.) Standard Encyclopaedia of the Alcohol Problem 6 volumes (1925–1930), comprehensive international coverage to late 1920s
 Gately, Iain Drink: A Cultural History of Alcohol (2008). .
 Heath, Dwight B. International Handbook on Alcohol and Culture (1995), 27 countries in late 20th century
 Phillips, Rod. Alcohol: A History (U. of North Carolina Press, 2014)

Europe
 Bennett, Judith M. Ale, Beer, and Brewsters in England: Women's Work in a Changing World, 1300-1600 (Oxford University Press, 1996)
 Brennan, Thomas. Public Drinking and Popular Culture in Eighteenth Century Paris (1988),
 Clark, Peter. The English Alehouse: A Social History, 1200–1800 (1983).
 Unger, Richard W. Beer in the Middle Ages and the Renaissance (U of Pennsylvania Press, 2004)

Further reading
Historic Taverns of Boston by Gavin R. Nathan

External links

Types of drinking establishment
Restaurants by type